Naturally occurring chromium (24Cr) is composed of four stable isotopes; 50Cr, 52Cr, 53Cr, and 54Cr with 52Cr being the most abundant (83.789% natural abundance). 50Cr is suspected of decaying by β+β+ to 50Ti with a half-life of (more than) 1.8×1017 years. Twenty-two radioisotopes, all of which are entirely synthetic, have been characterized, the most stable being 51Cr with a half-life of 27.7 days. All of the remaining radioactive isotopes have half-lives that are less than 24 hours and the majority of these have half-lives that are less than 1 minute. This element also has two meta states, 45mCr, the more stable one, and 59mCr, the least stable isotope or isomer.

53Cr is the radiogenic decay product of 53Mn. Chromium isotopic contents are typically combined with manganese isotopic contents and have found application in isotope geology. Mn-Cr isotope ratios reinforce the evidence from 26Al and 107Pd for the early history of the Solar System. Variations in 53Cr/52Cr and Mn/Cr ratios from several meteorites indicate an initial 53Mn/55Mn ratio that suggests Mn-Cr isotope systematics must result from in-situ decay of 53Mn in differentiated planetary bodies. Hence 53Cr provides additional evidence for nucleosynthetic processes immediately before coalescence of the Solar System. The same isotope is preferentially involved in certain leaching reactions, thereby allowing its abundance in seawater sediments to be used as a proxy for atmospheric oxygen concentrations.

The isotopes of chromium range from 42Cr to 70Cr. The primary decay mode before the most abundant stable isotope, 52Cr, is electron capture and the primary mode after is beta decay.

List of isotopes 

|-
| rowspan=2|42Cr
| rowspan=2 style="text-align:right" | 24
| rowspan=2 style="text-align:right" | 18
| rowspan=2|42.00643(32)#
| rowspan=2|14(3) ms[13(+4-2) ms]
| β+ (>99.9%)
| 42V
| rowspan=2|0+
| rowspan=2|
| rowspan=2|
|-
| 2p (<.1%)
| 40Ti
|-
| rowspan=4|43Cr
| rowspan=4 style="text-align:right" | 24
| rowspan=4 style="text-align:right" | 19
| rowspan=4|42.99771(24)#
| rowspan=4|21.6(7) ms
| β+ (71%)
| 43V
| rowspan=4|(3/2+)
| rowspan=4|
| rowspan=4|
|-
| β+, p (23%)
| 42Ti
|-
| β+, 2p (6%)
| 41Sc
|-
| β+, α (<.1%)
| 39Sc
|-
| rowspan=2|44Cr
| rowspan=2 style="text-align:right" | 24
| rowspan=2 style="text-align:right" | 20
| rowspan=2|43.98555(5)#
| rowspan=2|54(4) ms[53(+4-3) ms]
| β+ (93%)
| 44V
| rowspan=2|0+
| rowspan=2|
| rowspan=2|
|-
| β+, p (7%)
| 43Ti
|-
| rowspan=2|45Cr
| rowspan=2 style="text-align:right" | 24
| rowspan=2 style="text-align:right" | 21
| rowspan=2|44.97964(54)
| rowspan=2|50(6) ms
| β+ (73%)
| 45V
| rowspan=2|7/2−#
| rowspan=2|
| rowspan=2|
|-
| β+, p (27%)
| 44Ti
|-
| rowspan=2 style="text-indent:1em" | 45mCr
| rowspan=2 colspan="3" style="text-indent:2em" | 50(100)# keV
| rowspan=2|1# ms
| IT
| 45Cr
| rowspan=2|3/2+#
| rowspan=2|
| rowspan=2|
|-
| β+
| 45V
|-
| 46Cr
| style="text-align:right" | 24
| style="text-align:right" | 22
| 45.968359(21)
| 0.26(6) s
| β+
| 46V
| 0+
|
|
|-
| 47Cr
| style="text-align:right" | 24
| style="text-align:right" | 23
| 46.962900(15)
| 500(15) ms
| β+
| 47V
| 3/2−
|
|
|-
| 48Cr
| style="text-align:right" | 24
| style="text-align:right" | 24
| 47.954032(8)
| 21.56(3) h
| β+
| 48V
| 0+
|
|
|-
| 49Cr
| style="text-align:right" | 24
| style="text-align:right" | 25
| 48.9513357(26)
| 42.3(1) min
| β+
| 49V
| 5/2−
|
|
|-
| 50Cr
| style="text-align:right" | 24
| style="text-align:right" | 26
| 49.9460442(11)
| colspan=3 align=center|Observationally Stable
| 0+
| 0.04345(13)
| 0.04294–0.04345
|-
| 51Cr
| style="text-align:right" | 24
| style="text-align:right" | 27
| 50.9447674(11)
| 27.7025(24) d
| EC
| 51V
| 7/2−
|
|
|-
| 52Cr
| style="text-align:right" | 24
| style="text-align:right" | 28
| 51.9405075(8)
| colspan=3 align=center|Stable
| 0+
| 0.83789(18)
| 0.83762–0.83790
|-
| 53Cr
| style="text-align:right" | 24
| style="text-align:right" | 29
| 52.9406494(8)
| colspan=3 align=center|Stable
| 3/2−
| 0.09501(17)
| 0.09501–0.09553
|-
| 54Cr
| style="text-align:right" | 24
| style="text-align:right" | 30
| 53.9388804(8)
| colspan=3 align=center|Stable
| 0+
| 0.02365(7)
| 0.02365–0.02391
|-
| 55Cr
| style="text-align:right" | 24
| style="text-align:right" | 31
| 54.9408397(8)
| 3.497(3) min
| β−
| 55Mn
| 3/2−
|
|
|-
| 56Cr
| style="text-align:right" | 24
| style="text-align:right" | 32
| 55.9406531(20)
| 5.94(10) min
| β−
| 56Mn
| 0+
|
|
|-
| 57Cr
| style="text-align:right" | 24
| style="text-align:right" | 33
| 56.943613(2)
| 21.1(10) s
| β−
| 57Mn
| (3/2−)
|
|
|-
| 58Cr
| style="text-align:right" | 24
| style="text-align:right" | 34
| 57.94435(22)
| 7.0(3) s
| β−
| 58Mn
| 0+
|
|
|-
| 59Cr
| style="text-align:right" | 24
| style="text-align:right" | 35
| 58.94859(26)
| 460(50) ms
| β−
| 59Mn
| 5/2−#
|
|
|-
| style="text-indent:1em" | 59mCr
| colspan="3" style="text-indent:2em" | 503.0(17) keV
| 96(20) µs
|
|
| (9/2+)
|
|
|-
| 60Cr
| style="text-align:right" | 24
| style="text-align:right" | 36
| 59.95008(23)
| 560(60) ms
| β−
| 60Mn
| 0+
|
|
|-
| rowspan=2|61Cr
| rowspan=2 style="text-align:right" | 24
| rowspan=2 style="text-align:right" | 37
| rowspan=2|60.95472(27)
| rowspan=2|261(15) ms
| β− (>99.9%)
| 61Mn
| rowspan=2|5/2−#
| rowspan=2|
| rowspan=2|
|-
| β−, n (<.1%)
| 60Mn
|-
| rowspan=2|62Cr
| rowspan=2 style="text-align:right" | 24
| rowspan=2 style="text-align:right" | 38
| rowspan=2|61.95661(36)
| rowspan=2|199(9) ms
| β− (>99.9%)
| 62Mn
| rowspan=2|0+
| rowspan=2|
| rowspan=2|
|-
| β−, n
| 61Mn
|-
| rowspan=2|63Cr
| rowspan=2 style="text-align:right" | 24
| rowspan=2 style="text-align:right" | 39
| rowspan=2|62.96186(32)#
| rowspan=2|129(2) ms
| β−
| 63Mn
| rowspan=2|(1/2−)#
| rowspan=2|
| rowspan=2|
|-
| β−, n
| 62Mn
|-
| 64Cr
| style="text-align:right" | 24
| style="text-align:right" | 40
| 63.96441(43)#
| 43(1) ms
| β−
| 64Mn
| 0+
|
|
|-
| 65Cr
| style="text-align:right" | 24
| style="text-align:right" | 41
| 64.97016(54)#
| 27(3) ms
| β−
| 65Mn
| (1/2−)#
|
|
|-
| 66Cr
| style="text-align:right" | 24
| style="text-align:right" | 42
| 65.97338(64)#
| 10(6) ms
| β−
| 66Mn
| 0+
| 
| 
|-
| 67Cr
| style="text-align:right" | 24
| style="text-align:right" | 43
| 66.97955(75)#
| 10# ms[>300 ns]
| β−
| 67Mn
| 1/2−#
|
|
|-
| rowspan=3|68Cr
| rowspan=3 style="text-align:right" | 24
| rowspan=3 style="text-align:right" | 44
| rowspan=3|67.98316(54)#
| rowspan=3|10# ms (>620 ns)
| β−?
| 68Mn
| rowspan=3|0+
| rowspan=3|
| rowspan=3|
|-
| β−, n?
| 67Mn
|-
| β−, 2n?
| 66Mn
|-
| rowspan=3|69Cr
| rowspan=3 style="text-align:right" | 24
| rowspan=3 style="text-align:right" | 45
| rowspan=3|68.98966(54)#
| rowspan=3|6# ms (>620 ns)
| β−?
| 69Mn
| rowspan=3|7/2+#
| rowspan=3|
| rowspan=3|
|-
| β−, n?
| 68Mn
|-
| β−, 2n?
| 67Mn
|-
| rowspan=3|70Cr
| rowspan=3 style="text-align:right" | 24
| rowspan=3 style="text-align:right" | 46
| rowspan=3|69.99395(64)#
| rowspan=3|6# ms (>620 ns)
| β−?
| 70Mn
| rowspan=3|0+
| rowspan=3|
| rowspan=3|
|-
| β−, n?
| 69Mn
|-
| β−, 2n?
| 68Mn

Chromium-51

Chromium-51 is a manmade isotope of chromium used in medicine as a radioisotopic tracer.

References

 Isotope masses from:

 Isotopic compositions and standard atomic masses from:

 Half-life, spin, and isomer data selected from the following sources.

External links
Chromium isotopes data from The Berkeley Laboratory Isotopes Project's

 
Chromium
Chromium